Erik Wickberg (July 6, 1904 – April 26, 1996) was the 9th General of The Salvation Army (1969-1974).

Born in Gävle, Sweden to officers David and Betty Wickberg, he was constantly moving around the world to follow his parents' appointments. As a teenager, he once beat the national Swiss chess champion. He soon began working as a clerk at the Salvation Army Headquarters in Switzerland while also working as a translator and Swedish teacher. Erik became a soldier of the Salvation Army in 1924 at Berne II Corps, being sworn in by Captain Otto Brekke.

In 1925, Erik became an Officer from Bern 2 Corps, Switzerland. His first appointment was corps officer in Hamilton, Scotland. He then took on the role of Training (Education) Officer in Germany, and Private Secretary to the Chief Secretary and Territorial Commander. He went on to become Private Secretary to International Secretary and Assistant to Under Secretary for Europe at International Headquarters (IHQ). Soon, he moved to Sweden as IHQ Liaison Officer. During World War II, he was appointed to Germany, where he was often obliged to sleep in air raid bunkers. When the war was over, he was assigned the task of post-war relief in war-torn Germany. His next positions were, divisional commander of Uppsala, Sweden, Switzerland Chief Secretary, Sweden Chief Secretary, Territorial Commander of Germany, and Chief of the Staff (IHQ), before becoming the General. He was recognized with awards from Sweden, Korea, and The Federal Republic of Germany. Salvation Army work began in Bangladesh, Spain, Portugal, and Venezuela while he was General. He retired from active service on July 5, 1974 and died on April 26, 1996.

General Wickberg was honoured by many nations for his service to God and humanity. He was made Commander, Order of Vasa (1970); admitted to the Order of Moo Koong Wha (Korea, 1970); received an honorary Doctor of Laws (Korea, 1970); awarded the Grand Cross of Merit, Federal Republic of Germany (1971); and awarded the King’s Golden Medal (Grand Cross), Sweden (1980). He authored two books: Inkallad (God’s Conscript) (autobiography, Sweden, 1978) and Uppdraget (The Charge - My Way to Preaching, 1990).

Wives
Erik Wickberg married Ensign Frieda de Groot in 1929, but she died a year later. He then married Captain Margarete Dietrich in 1932, who died in 1976. His third wife was Major Eivor Lindberg, whom he married in 1977.

Wickberg, Erik
Wickberg, Erik
Wickberg, Erik
Wickberg, Erik
Wickberg